Phillip Farrell Hiatt (born May 1, 1969) is a retired Major League Baseball utility player.

Hiatt played college baseball at Louisiana Tech University.

Hiatt played for three different major league ball clubs during his career: the Kansas City Royals (1993–1995), Detroit Tigers (1996), and Los Angeles Dodgers (2001). He made his Major League Baseball debut on April 7, 1993, and played his final game on October 7, 2001. He played in Japan for the Hanshin Tigers in 1997.

Hiatt last appeared with a Major League team as non-roster invitee of the Washington Nationals during spring training prior to the 2005 season. He was not added to the big league roster.

He was named in the Mitchell Report on Steroid Abuse in Baseball on December 13, 2007.

Hiatt played over 1400 minor league games in his career and hit over 300 home runs in the minor leagues. He was named the International League MVP in 1996, when he totaled 42 home runs and 119 RBI.

See also
 List of Major League Baseball players named in the Mitchell Report

References

External links

Baseball players from Florida
Kansas City Royals players
Detroit Tigers players
Los Angeles Dodgers players
Major League Baseball third basemen
Major League Baseball outfielders
American expatriate baseball players in Japan
Hanshin Tigers players
Eugene Emeralds players
Baseball City Royals players
Memphis Chicks players
Omaha Royals players
Toledo Mud Hens players
Buffalo Bisons (minor league) players
Indianapolis Indians players
Colorado Springs Sky Sox players
Las Vegas 51s players
Iowa Cubs players
New Orleans Zephyrs players
1969 births
Living people
Louisiana Tech Bulldogs baseball players
International League MVP award winners
Pacific Coast League MVP award winners